Neckarzimmern is a municipality in the district of Neckar-Odenwald-Kreis, in Baden-Württemberg, Germany. Neckarzimmern also was the main site of dispersal for the German Anti-Friction Bearings Industry during the Allied bombing of Germany. This site was chosen because an abandoned mine provided excellent protection for the machinery. Most of the machines that were transferred here were from the Schweinfurt factory.

Sons and Daughters of the Community

 Emil Stumpp (1886-1941), press drawer

Other persons associated with the place
 
 
 Ernst von Gemmingen (1759-1813), composer and aristocrat
 Götz von Berlichingen († 1562), owner of Burg Hornberg

References

Neckar-Odenwald-Kreis
Populated places on the Neckar basin
Populated riverside places in Germany